The 2013 Louisiana–Lafayette Ragin' Cajuns baseball team represented the University of Louisiana at Lafayette in the 2013 NCAA Division I baseball season. The Ragin' Cajuns played their home games at M. L. Tigue Moore Field and were led by the nineteenth year head coach Tony Robichaux.

Preseason

Sun Belt Conference Coaches Poll
The Sun Belt Conference Coaches Poll was released on February 11, 2013. Louisiana-Lafayette was picked to finish eighth in the Sun Belt with 39 votes and 1 first-place vote.

Preseason All-Sun Belt team
Chance Cleveland (UALR, SR, Pitcher)
Austin Gomber (FAU, SO, Pitcher)
Michael Ellis (FIU, JR, Pitcher)
Johnathan Frebis (MTSU, SO, Pitcher)
Nate Hill (TROY, SR, Pitcher)
Aramis Garcia (FIU, SO, Catcher)
Mark Nelson (FAU, SR, 1st Base)
Logan Kirkland (USA, SO, 2nd Base)
Dustin Jones (ARST, JR, Shortstop)
Logan Pierce (TROY, SR, 3rd Base)
Logan Uxa (ARST, SR, Outfield)
Trent Miller (MTSU, JR, Outfield)
Danny Collins (TROY, JR, Outfield)
Whitt Dorsey (USA, SR, Designated Hitter)
Jordan Patterson (USA, JR, Utility)

Roster

Coaching staff

Schedule and results

Baton Rouge Regional

References

Louisiana-Lafayette
Louisiana Ragin' Cajuns baseball seasons
Louisiana-Lafayette baseball
2013 NCAA Division I baseball tournament participants